Al-Akhnas ibn Shurayq al-Thaqafī (Arabic: الأخنس بن شريق الثقفي) was a contemporary to Muhammad and one of the leaders of Mecca.

Biography

Late life — ?-610
He was a rich man  and an ally of Banu Zuhrah.

Muhammad's era — 610-632

Muhammad's visit to Ta'if — 619

On his way from the visit, Muhammad asked al-Akhnas for protection, but he refused.

Battle of Badr — 624
Al-Akhnas and the Banu Zuhrah were with the Meccan as part of the escort that preceded the Battle of Badr, but since he believed the caravan to be safe, he did not join Quraish on their way to a festival in Badr. He together with Banu Zuhrah returned, so these two clans were never present in the battle.

Battle of Uhud — 625
Abd-Allah ibn Jahsh was a cousin of Muhammad who was killed in the Battle of Uhud by al-Akhnas ibn Shurayq.

Treaty of Hudaybiyyah — 628
After the Treaty of Hudaybiyyah, Abu Basir ‘Utbah ibn Asid ibn Jãriyah ath-Thaqafi (a man of the tribe of Thaqif captured by the Quraysh) escaped from the idolators of Mecca. Al-Akhnas ibn Shurayq (a chief of the Quraysh) sent two men after him. Abu Basir killed one of the two men, and came to the Messenger of Allah as an immigrant Muslim.

Uncategorized
Surah Al-Humaza was revealed regarding al-Akhnas ibn Shurayq.

Regarding verse , an incident occurred prior to these verses being revealed. A man named al-Akhnas ibn Shuriq came to Muhammad to embrace Islam, but as he turned to leave, he happened to pass by a pasture and grazing animals. He set it alight and killed the cattle. These verses express disapproval.

See also
Non-Muslim interactants with Muslims during Muhammad's era

References

External links
 He is mentioned in these links: 
https://quran.com/2:205/tafsirs/en-tafisr-ibn-kathir

The Koran/The Q'uran by Mohammed/Mohammad/Muhamad/Muhammad/Mohomet - Full Text Free Book (Part 10/14)

The Koran/The Q'uran by Mohammed/Mohammad/Muhamad/Muhammad/Mohomet - Full Text Free Book (Part 11/14)

Opponents of Muhammad
Companions of the Prophet